The 2020–21 season was Fenerbahçe's 107th season in the existence of the club. The team played in the Basketball Super League and in the Euroleague.

Players

Squad information

Depth chart

Transactions

In

|}

Out

|}

Out on loan

|}

Pre-season and friendlies

Friendly match

Competitions

Overview

Basketball Super League

League table

Results summary

Results by round

Matches

Basketball Super League Playoffs

Quarterfinals

Semifinals

Finals

EuroLeague

League table

Results summary

Results by round

Matches

Euroleague Playoffs

Quarterfinals

Statistics

EuroLeague

References

Fenerbahçe men's basketball seasons
Fenerbahçe
Fenerbahçe